Birr GAA is a Gaelic Athletic Association club located in the town of Birr in County Offaly, Ireland.  The club is almost exclusively concerned with the game hurling and is one of the most successful hurling clubs in the country.

While a number of teams represented Birr in the 1880s and 1890s, the current club was formally founded in 1909. St Brendan's Park, located on the south side of the town on Railway Road, is the home ground of the club.

Honours

 All-Ireland Senior Club Hurling Championships: 4
 1995, 1998, 2002, 2003
 Leinster Senior Club Hurling Championships: 7
 1991, 1994, 1997, 1999, 2001, 2002, 2007
 Offaly Senior Hurling Championships: 22
 1912, 1913, 1915, 1938, 1940, 1943, 1944, 1946, 1948, 1971, 1991, 1994, 1997, 1999, 2000, 2001, 2002, 2003, 2005, 2006, 2007, 2008
 Offaly Intermediate Hurling Championships: 4
 1997, 1998, 1999, 2007 
 Offaly Junior A Hurling Championships: 1
 1985
 Offaly Junior Football Championships: 5
 1918, 1946, 1992, 2001, 2005

Notable players
 Declan Pilkington
 Johnny Pilkington
 Brian Whelahan

References

External links
 Birr town GAA Club website 

Gaelic games clubs in County Offaly
Hurling clubs in County Offaly
Birr, County Offaly